Shimoda is a Japanese surname. Notable people with the surname include:

, Japanese boxer
, Japanese singer and voice actress
, Japanese politician
, Japanese racing driver
, Japanese footballer
, Japanese professional wrestler 
, Japanese writer and Scouting pioneer
, Japanese footballer
, Japanese politician, diplomat, judge and baseball commissioner 
, Japanese educator and poet 
Yuki Shimoda (1921–1981), American actor

Fictional characters
Donald Shimoda, a character in the novel Illusions
Jim Shimoda, a character in the Star Trek franchise

Japanese-language surnames